Anglo-Chinese School (Independent) (ACS(I)) is an independent Methodist secondary school in Dover, Singapore. Founded in 1886 by Reverend William Fitzjames Oldham, it was recognised as an International Baccalaureate World School in 2005, and has since consistently ranked among the top three schools worldwide that offer the IB Diploma Programme.

Keeping in line with its history as a boys' school, ACS(I) provides secondary education for only boys from Years 1 to 4. Since 2012, ACS(I) and its affiliated school Methodist Girls' School (MGS) have partnered for an Integrated Programme, which allows ACS(I) and MGS students to skip the Singapore-Cambridge GCE Ordinary Level examinations and proceed directly to Years 5 and 6 at ACS(I) to complete the IB Diploma Programme.

History

ACS was offered 'independent' status by the Ministry of Education in 1987. This was accepted by the ACS Board of Governors. In 1992, the school moved to a new campus at Dover Road. The site was opened by Finance Minister Richard Hu on 1 March 1993, the 107th anniversary of the school's founding by Bishop William Fitzjames Oldham.

ACS was founded on 1 March 1886 by Bishop William Fitzjames Oldham as an extension of the Methodist Church in Singapore. Its first location was a shophouse at 70 Amoy Street with a total of 13 pupils. Its name came from the fact that it conducted lessons in English at night and Chinese in the afternoon. By the following year, enrolment had increased to 104, and the school moved to Coleman Street.

Between 1914 and 1920, led by Reverend J. S. Nagle, the school introduced regular religious services and physical education classes. Afternoon classes were also established for academically weaker pupils. In a bid to ensure continuity in school life and keep the school adequately staffed, Nagle encouraged former students, known as "old boys", to return to the school as teachers. To this day, the Anglo-Chinese School Old Boys' Association is a link through which old boys may keep ties with the school.

The Anglo-Chinese Continuation School was started by the new principal, Reverend P. L. Peach, in 1925, for students who had to leave the school due to the newly imposed age limits on school-going boys by the government. Eventually, ACS was renamed the Oldham Methodist School. A secondary school was opened at Cairnhill Road.

During the Japanese occupation of Singapore between 1942 and 1945, lessons were suspended, and the school re-opened its doors only in 1946, a year after the Japanese surrender, when the buildings at Cairnhill and Coleman Street were made safe from war damage. The pre-war principal, T. W. Hinch, who had been interned by the Japanese, returned to the school. He set up "X" and "Y" classes, each with different levels of difficulty, for students who had missed years of their education due to the Occupation. In September 1950, the secondary school moved from Cairnhill to Barker Road.

Also in 1950, Post School Certificate Classes, later known as Pre-University Classes because they were supposed to prepare students for tertiary education, were set up, and the first batch of girl students was enrolled in ACS. Students in the lower grades continued to be all-boys, a practice which persists to this day. Thio Chan Bee, the first Asian principal of ACS, took over in 1952. During his tenure, both the Cairnhill and Barker Road premises were expanded, the latter with the building of the Lee Hall, a three-storey building housing twelve classrooms and four laboratories.

In 1986, ACS celebrated its centenary with the publication of a hardback history of the school entitled Hearts, Hopes and Aims.

ACSP moved out of the Coleman Street campus in 1994; in its place now are the National Archives. In 1988 the Ministry of Education started its Independent School programme. Independent schools are allowed to be privately funded and subject to less government regulation in setting out their curriculum. The school was renamed ACS (Independent); in 1993 the Barker Road campus was vacated and the school moved to Dover Road. After strong lobbying by alumni, the Barker Road site was retained for a second secondary school. At the same time, Anglo-Chinese Primary School abandoned Coleman Street (the old building now housing the National Archives of Singapore) to share premises with the new secondary school at Barker Road, now named ACS (Barker Road).

When Bishop Oldham started the school in 1886, he also took in some students as boarders. The boarding facility soon expanded and moved into ever-larger premises, first in Bellevue at Oldham Lane, then to Dunearn House at Barker Road. In 1986, when ACS celebrated its centennial year, the boarding school known as Oldham Hall moved into new premises within the ACS Barker Road campus. It moved back into the rebuilt premises in December 2002 and was renamed ACS Oldham Hall to emphasise its roots as a strong and vibrant member of the ACS family.

Principals
The principal of the school is also the school's Chief Executive Officer. The first principal of the independent school was Lawrence Chia, an associate professor of chemistry at the National University of Singapore and a Presbyterian elder. Chia stepped down at the end of 1993 and one of his two vice-principals was selected to replace him. Ong Teck Chin held the post from 1994 to October 2010. From 5 October 2010, Fanny Tan was appointed acting principal in his stead, until the appointment of Winston James Hodge as new principal with effect from 21 June 2011. Then, in December 2018, Arene Koh was appointed as principal.

Awards
ACS (Independent) was awarded the Singapore Quality Award (SQA) in October 2009. ACS (Independent) has achieved the Singapore Quality Award, all four Best Practice Awards, School Distinction and School Excellence Awards. ACS(I) has won The Straits Times''' 'Top School in Sports (Boys)' award 14 times, starting with the first award in 1996 and winning thereafter every year until 2010, with the exception of 1999.

It has been consistently ranked as one of the top secondary schools in Singapore. In the GCE 'Ordinary' level examinations, ACS(I) had been ranked in the top 15 institutions in Singapore for a number of years since 1995. In 2008 it was reported that ACS(I) students taking the IB exams for the first time had produced results among the best in the world: nine students had obtained the perfect score of 45, making up almost half the 20 candidates worldwide to do so. It was also reported that ACS(I)'s performance put it among the top three IB schools in the world. In 2010, 27 students worldwide were reported to have achieved the perfect score, of whom 13 came from the ACS(I) November 2009 examination cohort. In 2011, it produced 28 students who earned the perfect score. The number of perfect scorers increased to 29 in 2012. and 37 in 2013. In 2014, the school produced 32 of the 43 students nationwide who obtained perfect scores. In 2015, 34 students scored the perfect score. In 2016, 41 scored the perfect score, accounting for the 48 in Singapore and 81 worldwide to do so. In 2018 ACS scored an average of 41.6 points per IBDP student making it the top IB school in the world as per the league tables published by Education Advisers Ltd.

Curriculum
International Baccalaureate Diploma Programme
The school was invited by the Ministry of Education (MOE) to pioneer an Integrated Programme along with several other schools, targeted at high-achieving students. As these students are expected to attend university, MOE decided that it would benefit them to bypass GCE 'O' Level and sit directly for a pre-university examination. Accordingly, in 2004 ACS(I) began its Integrated Programme, adopting the International Baccalaureate Diploma Programme (IBDP) to that end. Intakes for the Integrated Programme are at Years 1, 3 and 5.

ACS(I) was also one of the first schools to offer the Gifted Education Programme, and is the only school that offers it alongside the Integrated Programme. From 2012 onwards, students from Methodist Girls' School will move to ACS(I) after their first four years, in year 5 to complete their 6-year IP leading to the IBDP with the ACS(I) batch, without taking the GCE "O" levels. Students who cannot cope with either of these may opt for the GCE 'O' Levels instead. The GEP is also offered in ACS(I)'s affiliate, Anglo-Chinese School (Primary).

Year 1 & 2
The overall programme consists of two main interdisciplinary academic strands; Strand 1 and 2 and other components such as Individualised Study Option (ISO), Disciplines of Thought (DOT), National Education (NE), Pastoral Care & Career Guidance (PCCG), Physical Education (PE), Co-curricular Activities (CCA) and enrichment options. Strand 1 is focused on mathematics, physical sciences, life sciences, earth sciences, information sciences and technological studies and also contains elements of social sciences. Strand 2 is focused on the languages, language arts and literature, history and social studies and also contains elements of the performing arts in general. The Strand 2 curriculum was adapted from an ACS(I) GEP design. The remaining components include PE/CCA, NE/PCCG programmes and enrichment options designed to develop leadership ability and creativity. Specialised Art and Music electives, National Education, and affective/religious education are also included. Among subjects specially covered for the Integrated Programme in preparation for the year 5-6 IBDP,  are Introduction to Human Societies (IHS), Language Arts (LA), and Disciplines of Thought (DOT). They also have to complete a total of 120 hours of Creativity, Action, Service, and Leadership (CASL) and submit an Individualised Study Option (ISO) which prepares them for the IBDP's Creativity, Action, Service (CAS) and Extended Essay (EE).

Year 3 & 4
Years 3 and 4 utilise the same two-strand system, but with expanded scope and depth. In addition, an annual interdisciplinary colloquium is conducted where experts in different fields and teachers of various disciplines come together to discuss the similarities and differences of their subjects with each other and with the student participants.

Year 5 & 6
Year 5 and 6 utilise the IB Diploma Programme. Diploma students study six subjects from at least five out of six subject groups, concurrently over two years, as well as the core elements of the programme (Theory of Knowledge, the Extended Essay and Creativity, Action, Service). At least three, and not more than four of the six subjects selected are taken at higher level (HL), the others at standard level (SL). HL courses represent 240 teaching hours, and require a greater depth of study across a broader range of content in the subject. SL courses require 150 hours and provide breadth of study across the whole Diploma Programme.

Other programmes
Along with the default Integrated Programme, ACS offers the Foreign Language Programme, the Malay Special Programme (MSP),the Music Elective Programme (MEP) and the Regional Studies Programme (RSP), the latter two which are offered only by a few selected schools. ACS also offers the Gifted Education Programme (Singapore) (GEP) now known as the School-based Gifted Education (SBGE) for academically brilliant students, among the top 1% in the nation.

In addition, ACS also offers a specialised subject combination in Years 3 & 4 called the Accelerated Science Programme (ASP).

Culture and tradition

Aims
The school's stated aim is to have every student be 'A Scholar, an Officer and a Gentleman'. The school motto, 'The Best Is Yet To Be', is taken from the second line of the poem "Rabbi ben Ezra" (1864) by Robert Browning, and serves to encourage students to achieve greater heights by reminding them that their best achievements are yet to come.

Discipline
In 2001, principal Ong Teck Chin told The Straits Times that "we have corporal punishment for some serious offences. But the rules are stated clearly in the school handbook and we have to be consistent in applying them." A publicity document for entry into the school's International Baccalaureate (IB) programme from age 16/17 to age 18/19 says that a punishment for violations of the school's academic honesty policy is "caning (only for male students) which will be conducted in the Principal's office, classroom or during school assembly." "All students who have been caned will be required to attend counselling sessions arranged by the school".

Student activities

House system

The house system is a way of grouping students into mutually competitive groups. It was introduced on 16 April 1929 during the tenure of Principal Thomas W. Hinch. ACS Houses were named initially after churchmen Bishop James Thoburn, Bishop William F. Oldham, and Reverend Goh Hood Keng; and philanthropists Tan Kah Kee and Cheong Koon Seng. In 2005, three other benefactors of the school were honoured by having houses named after them: these were Lee Seng Gee, Shaw Vee Meng and Tan Chin Tuan.

The houses in chronological order, and their house colours, are:
 Thoburn - Green
 Oldham - Red
 Goh Hood Keng (GHK) - Yellow
 Tan Kah Kee (TKK) - Dark Blue
 Cheong Koon Seng (CKS) - Light Blue
 Lee Seng Gee (LSG) - Grey
 Shaw Vee Meng (SVM) - Purple
 Tan Chin Tuan (TCT) - Tan/Orange

Co-curricular Activities (CCA)
The school has over 50 different CCAs, including more than 10 clubs and societies in diverse fields. Participation in 2 CCAs is compulsory for all pupils from Year 1 to 4. Each student participates in 2 CCAs: a Uniformed Group and either Sports, Service, Clubs and Societies or Cultural Activities.
A student is exempted from taking part in the Uniformed Group only for the following reasons:

 Medical reasons
 Is in the National Sports Teams recognised under the Singapore Schools Sports Council
 Is in the Performance Groups approved by the School:
 Singapore National Youth Orchestra
 ACS Symphonic Band
 ACS Boys Brigade Bagpipe Band
 Has gotten and accepted Sports DSA offer

The school also offers the usual suite of uniformed groups and a full range of performing arts and sports groups.

ACS Old Boys Association (OBA)
The OBA was formed by accident rather by design when Reverend J. S. Nagle, Principal of ACS (1913–1922), was tasked with fulfilling Bishop William F. Oldham's vision of building an ACS College. Nagle contacted the Old Boys, some of whom were distinguished citizens holding prominent positions in society then, to garner their support to realise Oldham's dream. Though this dream failed to materialise, the ACSOBA was formed. It was officially formed on 10 July 1914, 28 years after ACS was started at Amoy Street.

Campus

Facilities
ACS(I) has a number of facilities, including a campus-wide Wi-Fi network, air-conditioned classrooms, computer and science laboratories, multi-purpose halls, auditoriums, and lecture theatres. ACS(I) is known for its sporting tradition and has numerous sports facilities, including an artificial turf, a gymnasium, swimming pools and basketball, squash and tennis courts.

 Boarding school 

Established in 1994, the ACS (Independent) Boarding School houses around 500 students, mostly overseas scholars from the People's Republic of China, Indonesia, Vietnam, Malaysia, and India.

It has many various facilities, including a daily laundry service, Wi-Fi in common areas and daily meals. Boarders may also use the ACS(I) facilities

All who are leading there are staff members or school leaders of ACS(I).

The Shaw Library and Resource Centre
The library is named after its financial benefactor, Runme Shaw. It contains over 100,000 books, reference materials and IB syllabus-based course books.

Achievements
Sports and games
ACS (Independent) has achieved good sporting results through the years, having produced national champions and national sportsmen. It has been strong in swimming, sailing, water-polo and rugby. It has been The Straits Times Top School in Sports (Boys) in an almost unbroken streak since this title was first awarded, from 1996 to 2009. The exception was 1999, in which The Chinese High School won the title. The record number of gold medals in a single season was achieved in 2018, where it won 17 gold medals and 10 silver medals. The school has held many winning streaks such as the "B" Division Rugby Title from 1997–2003 and the "C" Division Rugby Title from 1997–2009. In 2008, ACS (Independent) won a grand slam in Rugby, winning all three "A" Division, "B" Division and "C" Division titles.

National inter-schools championships 
Note : Records from 1989 onwards; "A" Division records from 2007 onwards

 Air pistol "C" Division: 2019
 "B" Division: 2006, 2009
 "A" Division: 2010, 2018
 Air rifle "C" Division: 2003
 "B" Division: 2010
 Badminton "C" Division: 1996, 1997,2017
 "B" Division: 1992, 1993, 1994, 1995, 1998, 2010, 2013, 2014, 2016, 2018, 2019
 "A" Division: 2010, 2011, 2013, 2014, 2019Basketball Bowling "C" Division: 1995, 1996, 1997, 1998, 2000, 2001, 2002, 2003, 2004, 2007, 2008, 2011
 "B" Division: 1995, 1996, 1998, 2002, 2003, 2004, 2005, 2006, 2016, 2021
 "A" Division: 2018, 2019, 2021
 Canoeing "C" Division: 2000, 2004, 2010, 2013
 "B" Division: 2000, 2004, 2006, 2007, 2008, 2009, 2010, 2011, 2012, 2014, 2015
 "A" Division: 2008
 Cricket "C" Division: 1996, 2000, 2003, 2004, 2005, 2006, 2008, 2009, 2016, 2017, 2018, 2019, 2022
 "B" Division: 2003, 2006, 2007, 2008, 2009, 2012, 2016, 2018, 2019, 2022
 "A" Division: 2010, 2014, 2016, 2017, 2019, 2022

 Golf "C" Division: 2008, 2017, 2022
 "B" Division: 2010, 2022
 "A" Division: 2022
 Rugby (15-a-side)Record of Past Champions , redsports.sg. Retrieved 27 August 2007.
 "C" Division: 1993, 1995, 1997, 1998, 1999, 2000, 2001, 2002, 2003, 2004, 2005, 2006, 2007, 2008, 2009, 2011, 2014, 2016, 2017, 2018, 2019, 2022
 "B" Division: 1997, 1998, 1999, 2000, 2001, 2002, 2003, 2007, 2008, 2010, 2011, 2013, 2015, 2016, 2017, 2019, 2022
 "A" Division: 2008, 2011, 2012, 2014, 2015, 2016, 2017, 2018, 2019, 2022
 Sailing "C" Division: 1999, 2000, 2001,2004, 2006
 "B" Division: 1996, 1998, 1999, 2000, 2001, 2004, 2006, 2008
 "A Boys" Division: 2008
 Softball "C" Division: 2017 
 "B" Division: 2006, 2007
 "A" Division:silver 2007, 2008
 Squash "C" Division: 1998, 1999, 2000, 2006, 2007, 2008, 2009, 2010, 2017, 2022
 "B" Division: 1999, 2000, 2001, 2002, 2003, 2004, 2005, 2006, 2007, 2009, 2010, 2011, 2022
 "A" Division: 2007, 2008, 2012, 2013, 2014, 2022

 Swimming "C" Division: 1993, 1994, 1995, 1996, 1997, 1998, 2003, 2004, 2007, 2009, 2010, 2011, 2012, 2014, 2015, 2016, 2017, 2018, 2019, 2022
 "B" Division: 1993, 1994, 1995, 1996, 1997, 1998, 2004, 2005, 2006, 2009, 2010, 2011, 2012, 2013, 2014, 2015, 2016, 2017, 2018, 2019
 "A" Division: 2014, 2015, 2016, 2017, 2018, 2019, 2022
 Tennis "C" Division: 1991, 1992, 1993, 1995, 1996, 1997, 1998, 2000, 2001, 2004, 2005, 2010, 2011, 2015, 2016, 2018, 2022
 "B" Division: 1993, 1995, 1996, 1997, 2002, 2003, 2005, 2007, 2009, 2011, 2013, 2015, 2016, 2017, 2021, 2022
 "A" Division: 2008, 2015, 2016, 2017, 2022
 Water-Polo "C" Division: 1992, 1993, 1996, 1997, 1998, 2005, 2008, 2009, 2010, 2011, 2012, 2014, 2015, 2016, 2018
 "B" Division: 1992, 1993, 1997, 1998, 1999, 2000, 2005, 2006, 2010, 2011, 2012, 2014, 2016, 2018, 2022
 X-Country "C" Division: 2013, 2016, 2019
 "B" Division: 2004, 2015, 2017
 "A" Division: 2016, 2017

Uniformed groups
The school has also performed well in its uniformed groups, achieving Gold and Best Unit awards multiple times over the past years. In 2011 alone, all of the school's units have attained a Gold award. ACS (Independent) holds the record of having the largest amount of Uniformed Groups in a single school. In addition to this, ACS (Independent) is the only school with a National Cadet Corps Tri-Service, and one of two schools which pioneered the National Police Cadet Corps. The Scout and Venture Scout units of the school are also the largest in Singapore. The Boys' Brigade and Boys' Brigade Primers also encompasses the Boys' Brigade Bagpipe Band, one of only 15 in Singapore. However, the NPCC (Sea) unit and Military Bagpipe Band have since been shut down.

 National Cadet Corps (Air) Best Unit Competition (Gold): 2001, 2002, 2003, 2004, 2005, 2006, 2007, 2008, 2009, 2010, 2011, 2012
 Best NCC (Air) Unit: 2001, 2004, 2010, 2011, 2012, 2013, 2015
 Best Overall NCC Unit (discontinued since 2010) 2010
 C.M. Philips Award: 2011
 National Cadet Corps (Land) Best Unit Competition (Gold): 2004, 2005, 2006, 2007, 2008, 2009, 2010, 2011
 National Cadet Corps (Sea) Best Unit Competition (Gold): 2004, 2005, 2006, 2007, 2008, 2009, 2010, 2011
 Best NCC (Sea) Unit: 2005, 2010, 2011

 National Civil Defence Cadet Corps Unit Overall Proficiency Award (Gold): 2008, 2009, 2010, 2011, 2012, 2013, 2014, 2015, 2016, 2017
 Precision Drill Competition (Champion): 2012
 National Police Cadet Corps 
 Unit Overall Proficiency Award (Gold): 2000, 2001, 2002, 2003, 2004, 2007, 2008, 2009, 2010, 2011, 2012, 2013, 2014, 2015

 Military Bagpipe Band Boys' Brigade J.M. Fraser Award (Gold): 2001, 2002, 2003, 2004, 2005, 2006, 2007, 2008, 2010, 2011
 Best Seniors' Company: 2006, 2007, 2008, 2010
 Boys' Brigade Primers Boys' Brigade Bagpipe Band Boys' Brigade Pipes and Drums Festival BB Category (Champion): 2015, 2016, 2017
 Boys' Brigade Pipes and Drums Festival Open Category (Champion): 2015, 2016, 2017

 Scouts Frank Cooper Sands' Award (Gold): 2001, 2002, 2003, 2004, 2005, 2006, 2007, 2008, 2009, 2010, 2011,2012,2013,2014, 2015, 2016,2017, 2018, 2019
 National Patrol Camp: 2008, 2009, 2010, 2013, 2016,2018
 Venture Scouts Frank Cooper Sands' Award (Gold): 2005, 2006, 2007, 2008, 2009, 2010, 2011, 2012, 2013, 2014, 2015, 2016, 2017, 2018
 St. John's Brigade Corps Achievement Award (Gold): 2002, 2003, 2005, 2006, 2007, 2008, 2009, 2010, 2011, 2012, 2013, 2014, 2015, 2016,2017,2018

Clubs, societies and performing arts
The ACS(I) Debate Team has a strong debating tradition, with many of the members going on to represent Singapore at the World Schools Debating Championships. ACS(I) emerged National Champions in 1998, 2005 and 2013 as well as 1st Runner-Up in 2004, 2006 and 2016 in the Singapore Secondary Schools Debating Championships. At the national championships for pre-university levels organised by the Singapore Ministry of Education, ACS(I) emerged champions in 2010 and 2018 as well as 1st Runner-Up in 2012, 2014 and 2019. In 2010, ACS(I) emerged champions in the Ministry of Finance Budget Debate for the Secondary School division and 1st Runner-Up for the Pre-University division.

The school's Young Diplomats' Society has received awards in multiple Model United Nations Conferences both locally and overseas and also organises the annual International Model United Nations Conference.

Between 1998 and 2012, the school's Philharmonic Orchestra obtained seven consecutive Gold Awards in the biennial Singapore Youth Festival competition, the only youth string ensemble to have done so. The Orchestra achieved two Gold with Honours awards at the 2007 SYF competition, for both its Secondary and College String groups. In 2013, 2015 and 2017, following the festival's award scheme revamp, the orchestra  attained the Distinction award, the highest possible honour. It also collaborated with the Singapore Armed Forces Central Band in March 2007, and was the featured orchestra in the 2007 HSBC Young Talents' Concert.

The Symphonic Band won Gold with Honours awards in the 2005, 2007 and 2009 SYF competitions, being the only school besides Saint Patrick's School to have achieved this. It was ranked as one of the top three bands in all three years. The band also received a Gold in the 2011 competition. The Wind Ensemble received a Gold in its first year of participation in SYF in 2007, as well as a Bronze in 2009 and a Silver in 2011. In 2006, the band took part in the 17th Australian International Music Festival in Sydney, Australia, attaining a Gold Award. In the Singapore International Band Festival 2008, the band competed against professional bands in the open division and won the only Gold award, it also achieved second place in the Finals. In the SIBF competition for 2010, the band achieved Silver in the Open Category, while in 2012, the Symphonic Band was awarded a Gold in Division II and the Wind Ensemble was awarded Silver in Division I. In 2011, both the Symphonic Band and Wind Ensemble participated in the Senior Category at the Hong Kong Winter Band Festival, attaining Silver and Gold (2nd Placing) respectively. The Symphonic Band has also received Distinction Awards at the 2013 and 2015 Singapore Youth Festival Arts Presentation for Concert Bands..

The Choir, established in the 1980s, has taken part in many international and local choral competitions and workshops. The Choir has achieved a Gold award in the 2009 SYF Central Judging, as well as a Gold award in the recent 2011 SYF Central Judging. The Choir also obtained a Gold award at the Genting International Choral Competition in 2007. The IB choir now performs as an a cappella society.

The Guitar Orchestra, established in 2003, has won three consecutive Gold medals in the SYF competitions, with a Gold award for its Secondary Orchestra and a Gold with Honours award for its College Orchestra in the 2007 SYF competition. The Secondary Orchestra obtained a Gold with Honours award in the 2009 SYF competition. It also hosts a yearly concert event, F.R.E.T.S (Finally a Really Exciting Thing to See).

Dance Venia, established in 2005, won the Gold with Honours Award at the Singapore Youth Festival Central Judging 2009 during their first participation in the event. Their latest achievements include 2 Certificates of Distinction at the same event in 2013 and 2015.

Notable alumni

 Politicians Vivian Balakrishnan, Minister for Foreign Affairs, Singapore
 Chen Show Mao, former Member of Parliament, Singapore
 Chiam See Tong, former Member of Parliament and Head of the Singapore People's Party, Singapore
 Fong Jen Arthur, Member of Parliament, Singapore
 Geh Min, Nominated Member of Parliament, Singapore
 Goh Keng Swee, former Deputy Prime Minister, Minister for Defence, Minister for Finance and Minister for Education, Singapore
 Ho Peng Kee, Senior Minister of State for Home Affairs, Singapore
 Dr Richard Hu, former Minister for Finance and Minister for Trade and Industry, Singapore
 Lam Pin Min, former Member of Parliament, Singapore
 Lee Teng-hui, first President of Fudan University, Shanghai, China
 Alvin Lie Ling Piao, member of People's Representative Council of Indonesia as the representative of National Mandate Party
 Lim Kim San, former cabinet minister, Chairman of the Housing and Development Board and Chairman of the Port of Singapore Authority, Singapore
 Lui Tuck Yew, former Minister for Transport and former Second Minister for Foreign Affairs, former Chief of Navy and former Chief Executive of the Maritime and Port Authority, Singapore
 Sellapan Ramanathan, 6th President of Singapore
 Ng Eng Hen, former Education Minister and former Second Defence Minister, Singapore
 Sin Boon Ann, Member of Parliament, Singapore
 Tan Chuan Jin, Speaker of Parliament, Singapore
 Tan Soo Khoon, Member of Parliament, former Speaker of Parliament, Singapore
 Dr Tay Eng Soon, deceased Senior Minister of State (Education), Singapore
 Tharman Shanmugaratnam, Deputy Prime Minister, Minister for Finance and Manpower, Singapore
 Toh Chin Chye, Former Deputy Prime Minister, Singapore
 Yeo Cheow Tong, Member of Parliament, former Minister for Transport, Singapore
 Alvin Yeo, Senior Counsel, Senior Partner of WongPartnership LLP and Member of Parliament, Singapore
 Gerald Giam, Member of Parliament
 Yuen Pau Woo, Canadian Senator representing British Columbia
 Chee Soon Juan, Secretary-General of the Singapore Democratic Party
 Athletes Ang Peng Siong, former Singapore national swimmer, co-founder and Managing Director of APS Swim School & Aquatic Performance Swim Club
 Mark Chay, Singapore national swimmer
 Desmond Koh, former Singapore national swimmer, Rhodes Scholar
 Joseph Schooling, national swimmer, participated in the 2012 London Olympics, gold medallist in the 2016 Rio Olympics
 Quah Zheng Wen, national swimmer, participated in the 2012 London Olympics
 Oon Jin Teik, CEO of Singapore Sports Council and former Singapore national swimmer
 Poh Seng Song, Singapore national sprinter
 Ronald Susilo, Former Singapore national badminton player
 Gary Tan, Singapore national swimmer
 Thum Ping Tjin, former Singapore national swimmer, Rhodes Scholar
 Business leaders Lim Siong Guan, former Head of Singapore Civil Service, Group President of Government of Singapore Investment Corporation
 Ong Beng Seng, Managing Director Hotel Properties Limited, brought Formula 1 back to Singapore
 Seow Poh Leng, founding member of the Ho Hong Bank
 Tan Sri Dr. Tan Chin Tuan, former Chairman of Oversea-Chinese Banking Corporation, philanthropist
 Tan Sri Dato' Sri Dr. Teh Hong Piow, Chairman of Public Bank

 Arts Terence Cao, Mediacorp 8 actor
 Mark Chan, composer and former Singapore national swimmer
 Glen Goei, international director
 Colin Goh, filmmaker and editor of TalkingCock.com
 Goh Soon Tioe, violinist and conductor of Singapore Youth Symphony Orchestra
 Ivan Heng, actor, director
 Nat Ho, Actor
 Kevin Kwan, novelist, best known for the bestselling satirical novels Crazy Rich Asians, China Rich Girlfriend, and Rich People Problems
 Hossan Leong, actor, Radio DJ
 Lin Junjie (Wayne Lim Jun Jie), singer
 James Lye, former TV actor
 Ong Keng Sen, director
 Adrian Pang, actor
 Bernard Tan, musician and composer
 Melvyn Tan, international pianist
 Eleanor Wong, playwright
 Russel Wong, photographer
 Jerrold Yam, poet and lawyer
 Other professions' Alex Au, social activist
 Belinda Ang, Singapore Supreme Court Judge
 Cavinder Bull, Senior Counsel
 Choo Han Teck, Supreme Court Judge
 Steven Chong, Judge of Appeal
 Winston Choo, Lieutenant-General (Retired), former Chief of the Defence Force, Singapore Armed Forces, Chairman of Singapore Red Cross
 Khoo Boon Hui, Senior Deputy Secretary, Ministry of Home Affairs, President of INTERPOL and former Commissioner of Police
 Glenn Knight, lawyer
 Lieutenant General Desmond Kuek Bak Chye, former Chief of the Defence Force, Singapore Armed Forces
 Li Denghui, founding President (1917–1937) of Fudan University
 Professor Lim Kok Ann, Dean of Medicine NUS (1965–72), President of Singapore Chess Federation (1961–72)
Lieutenant General Melvyn Ong, Chief of Defence Force, Singapore Army
 Andrew Phang, Judge of Appeal
 V K Rajah, Judge of Appeal, Attorney-General of Singapore (2014-2017)
 Lucien Wong, Attorney-General of Singapore (2017–Present), Senior Counsel
 Sim Kee Boon, former head of Singapore Civil Service
 Rear Admiral Ronnie Tay, former Chief of Navy, Republic of Singapore Navy
 Rear Admiral Frederick Chew, Director of Joint Operations, Singapore Armed Forces
 Woo Bih Li, Singapore Supreme Court Judge
 Wong Meng Kong, chess Grandmaster

See also
 Methodist Girls' School (Secondary)

Notes
1. ^ https://web.archive.org/web/20070930224744/http://www.moe.gov.sg/press/2004/pr2004sea_sda.htm", School Excellence Award (SEA), Ministry of Education, Singapore, 2006

References

External links
 ACS (Independent) Official web page
 Christie R. House, "Methodist Schools of Singapore: A Model", New World Outlook'' (United Methodist Church), March 2004.

Anglo-Chinese School
Educational institutions established in 1886
Educational institutions established in 1988
Independent schools in Singapore
Methodist schools
Secondary schools in Singapore
Schools offering Integrated Programme in Singapore
International Baccalaureate schools in Singapore
Queenstown, Singapore
Dover, Singapore
1988 establishments in Singapore
Schools in Central Region, Singapore